Earthbound is an American silent drama film from Goldwyn Pictures Corporation that was released on August 11, 1920. The film was written by Edfrid A. Bingham from a story by Basil King, and directed by T. Hayes Hunter. Earthbound was produced by Basil King with cinematography by André Barlatier, film editing by J.G. Hawks and art direction from Cedric Gibbons.  The plot involves the character Daisy Rittenshaw, whose husband murders her lover when he discovers their affair.  Her lover's ghost remains, unable to move on until he helps those whom he has wronged.

A print is prepared and preserved by MGM.

Cast

Wyndham Standing as Nicholas Desborough
Mahlon Hamilton as Jim Rittenshaw
Naomi Childers as Caroline Desborough
Flora Revalles as Daisy Rittenshaw
Alec B. Francis as Doctor Galloway
Billie Cotton as Connie Desborough
Lawson Butt as Harvey Breck
Kate Lester as Miss De Windt
Aileen Pringle (uncredited)

Reception

References

External links

 
 
 Alternative lobby poster

1920 films
1920s romantic fantasy films
American romantic fantasy films
American silent feature films
Films about the afterlife
American black-and-white films
American fantasy drama films
1920 drama films
1920s fantasy drama films
1920s American films
Silent American drama films